Cribb's Meadow is a  nature reserve east of Wymondham in Leicestershire. It is owned and managed by the Leicestershire and Rutland Wildlife Trust, and is designated a biological Site of Special Scientific Interest under the name Cribb's Lodge Meadows. It is also a National Nature Reserve and a Nature Conservation Review site, Grade 2.

The embankment of a disused railway runs through this ridge and furrow neutral meadow on boulder clay. The diverse flora includes adder's tongue fern, pepper saxifrage, hayrattle and green-winged orchid.

There is access from Fosse Lane, and a footpath runs through the southern end.

References

Leicestershire and Rutland Wildlife Trust
Nature Conservation Review sites
Sites of Special Scientific Interest in Leicestershire
National nature reserves in England